Boussin is a village and rural commune in the Cercle of Ségou in the Ségou Region of southern-central Mali. The commune includes 15 villages in an area of approximately 178 square kilometers. In the 2009 census it had a population of 12,401. The village of Boussin lies 36 km east of Ségou.

References

External links
.

Communes of Ségou Region